Lake Frances is located in Glacier National Park, in the U. S. state of Montana. Runoff from the Dixon Glacier empties into the south side of the lake while runoff from Thunderbird Glacier flows into Thunderbird Creek and into the east shore of the lake.

See also

 List of lakes in Glacier County, Montana

References

Francis
Francis